Hardbodies is a 1984 American sex comedy film about three middle-aged men who hire a younger man to help them pick up women at the beach. The film was directed by Mark Griffiths, and stars Grant Cramer, Courtney Gains and Gary Wood. It was followed by a 1986 sequel entitled Hardbodies 2.

Plot
Scotty, a con man who does whatever he can to get along, is evicted from his apartment for non-payment of rent. He soon finds three older divorced men who have a lot of money, however they do not have a trait that Scotty possesses: talent with women. They agree to let Scotty stay with them at their beach house (and pay him $600 a month), if he returns the favor by teaching them how to pick up women.

Scotty shows them how to "dialogue" women by giving them a dose of the old BBD (Bigger and Better Deal). Along this journey, Scotty loses his playboy ways and falls in love with acquaintance Kristi. Kristi, knowing Scotty's playboy past, puts up with his ups and downs early on in the movie but later insists that he change his ways. Scotty recognizes that Kristi is ultimately more important than the empty life he has led up until now and changes his ways.

Cast
 Grant Cramer as Scotty Palmer
 Teal Roberts as Kristi
 Courtney Gains as 'Rag'
 Gary Wood as Hunter
 Darcy DeMoss as Dede
 Cindy Silver as Kimberly
 Sorrells Pickard as Ashby
 Kristi Somers as Michelle
 Michael Rapport as 'Rounder'
 Roberta Collins as Lana
 Crystal Shaw Martell as Candy
 Kathleen Kinmont as Pretty Skater
 Janet Gardner as Diaper Rash Vocalist
 Jan Kuehnemund as Diaper Rash Lead Guitarist
 Tamara Ivanov as Diaper Rash Rhythm Guitarist
 Pia Maiocco as Diaper Rash Bassist
 Laurie Hedlund as Diaper Rash Drummer

Production
The film was originally made for broadcast on the Playboy Channel but Columbia picked it up for theatrical distribution.

Release
Hardbodies was released in Los Angeles on May 4, 1984 and was followed by a New York release on May 12, 1984.

Reception
On Metacritic the film has a score of 1 out of 100 based on reviews from 4 critics, indicating "overwhelming dislike".

References

External links
 
 

1984 films
1980s sex comedy films
Columbia Pictures films
1980s English-language films
American sex comedy films
Beach party films
1984 directorial debut films
1984 comedy films
Films directed by Mark Griffiths (director)
1980s American films